Gabriele Wilhelmine "Gaby" Köster is a German actress and comedian.

Life
Köster was born in Cologne, West Germany. Following secondary school, Köster began training to become a nursery-school teacher, which she broke off three weeks prior to completion. She then dedicated herself to music and painting, and some of her paintings were shown in exhibitions. To keep her head above water financially, she also worked in a bar where, in 1987, she met Jürgen Becker. Becker asked her to write a few sketches for a radio programme. Köster thought the guest was crazy but still wrote a sketch. She was surprised when the text she had submitted was actually used on the German radio station WDR in the programme Unterhaltung am Wochenende, broadcast on Saturdays between 4 and 6 pm.
Regular radio appearances and subsequently her own programmes were to follow.

Köster appeared on WDR television for the first time in 1991. She was a member of the cast of the alternative Cologne Carnival stage show between 1991 and 1995. Her somewhat bawdy humour is heightened by her Kölsch dialect.

Köster became known to a wider television audience through guest appearances on RTL Samstag Nacht. From 1996 until its discontinuation in 2005, she was a permanent cast member of the show 7 Tage, 7 Köpfe, produced by Rudi Carrell. Between 1999 and 2003, she also played the title role of "Rita Kruse" in the comedy series Ritas Welt. One of her last appearances was in December 2007 in a show produced by ProSieben, celebrating 20 years on stage of Michael Mittermeier.

At the beginning of 2008, Köster cancelled her Wer Sahne will, muss Kühe schütteln tour, which had only started a few weeks before. All other performance dates were later also cancelled. A media blackout prevented any information about Köster becoming available to the public. Her management took legal action against newspaper reports regarding an alleged illness.

It was revealed in early September 2011 that Köster had suffered a stroke on 8 January 2008, the effects of which were still physically debilitating. She appeared on 7 September 2011 for the first time again following her stroke on the RTL Television programme . Together with Till Hoheneder, Köster wrote the book Ein Schnupfen hätte auch gereicht – meine zweite Chance about her stroke and the time that followed. She also narrated the audiobook version. 
During this period, only Stern and stern TV were allowed to publish up-to-date pictures of her.

Köster lives in Cologne and has a son from her former marriage with director Thomas Köller.

Selected filmography

Awards and recognition
 1996: Gilden Kölsch Award
 1998: Bambi Award - Publikumspreis Best Comedy Show for 7 Tage, 7 Köpfe
 1998: Goldener Löwe for 7 Tage, 7 Köpfe
 1999: Deutscher Comedypreis - Best Comedian
 1999: Goldener Gong television award for the team behind 7 Tage, 7 Köpfe
 2000: Adolf-Grimme-Preis as comedian in Ritas Welt
 2000: Deutscher Comedypreis for Ritas Welt
 2000: Deutscher Fernsehpreis -Best Television Series Actress
 2003: Deutscher Comedypreis - Best Comedy Actress
 2007: Deutscher Comedypreis - Best Comedian

Books
 2011: with Till Hoheneder: Ein Schnupfen hätte auch gereicht – Meine zweite Chance. Scherz, Frankfurt am Main, 
 2015: Die Chefin. Novel, Pendo, Munich, 
 2019: with Till Hoheneder: Das Leben ist großartig – von einfach war nie die Rede. Ullstein leben, Berlin,

References

External links
 
 

German television actresses
German women comedians
Actors from Cologne
Living people
Year of birth missing (living people)